
Year 305 BC was a year of the pre-Julian Roman calendar. At the time, it was known as the Year of the Consulship of Megellus and Augurinus (or, less frequently, year 449 Ab urbe condita). The denomination 305 BC for this year has been used since the early medieval period, when the Anno Domini calendar era became the prevalent method in Europe for naming years.

Events 
 By place 
 Seleucid Empire 
 Seleucus, former officer of Alexander the Great, considers himself emperor of Persia. He attempts to recover lands taken by Chandragupta that had been a part of Alexander's Empire. Seleucus establishes Seleucia on the Tigris River as his capital.

 Syria 
 Antigonus I Monophthalmus sends his son Demetrius to initiate the  Siege of Rhodes, as the city has refused him armed support against Ptolemy.

 Roman Republic 
 The Roman consuls, Marcus Fulvius Curvus Paetinus and Lucius Postumius Megellus, decisively defeat the Samnites in the Battle of Bovianum to end the Second Samnite War.

Births 
 Zou Yan, Chinese philosopher (d. 240 BC)

Deaths

References